Not Yet a Woman, is Taiwanese Mandopop artist Rainie Yang's fourth Mandarin studio album. It was released by Sony Music Taiwan on 7 November 2008.

It features the ending theme song "帶我走" (Take Me Away) and insert song "太煩惱" (Too Much Trouble) of Taiwanese drama Miss No Good, starring Yang, Will Pan and Dean Fujioka. The track "太煩惱" (Too Much Trouble) is a cover song of German Alternative Rock band Wir sind Helden.

Track listing
 "太煩惱" Tai Fan Nao (Too Much Trouble)  - insert song of Miss No Good
 "帶我走" Dai Wo Zou (Take Me Away)  - ending theme song of Miss No Good
 "我的愛吊點滴" Wo De Ai Diao Dian Di (My Love Drips and Drops) - opening theme song of Prince + Princess 2
 "冷戰" Leng Zhan (Cold War)
 "火星" Huo Xing (Mars)
 "半熟宣言" Ban Shu Xuan Yan (Not Yet A Woman)
 "愛我請 Shutup" Ai Wo Qing Shut Up (Love Me Please Shutup)
 "在你懷裡的微笑" Zai Ni Huai Li De Wei Xiao (The Smile in Your Arms)
 "女生我最大" Nu Sheng Wo Zui Da (Girls, I'm The Biggest)
 "幸福的節拍" Xing Fu De Jie Pai (The Rhythm of Bliss) - theme song for a Darlie Toothpaste (黑人牙膏) commercial

Music videos
 "帶我走" (Take Me Away)
 "太煩惱" (Too Much Troubled)
 "冷戰" (Cold War)
 "我的愛吊點滴" (My Love Drips and Drops)
 "在你懷裡的微笑" (The Smile in Your Arms)

References

External links
  Rainie Yang@Sony Music Taiwan
  Rainie Yang discography@Sony Music Taiwan

2008 albums
Rainie Yang albums
Sony Music Taiwan albums